Corisella inscripta is a species of water boatman in the family Corixidae.  It is found in North America.

References

Further reading

 
 
 

Insects described in 1894
Corixini